Gllamnik is a village in Podujevë municipality.

The village is the site of Vindenis, a town in Roman Dardania.
Gllamnik is populated by Albanians who came from the tribe Gjenoll who settled here hundred years ago who probably came from Rugova highlands or north Albania who settled here during Ottoman Empire

Notes

References

Sources 
 F. Teichner, A. Drăgan, R. Dürr, Vindenis (Glavnik/Gllamnik, Kosovo) – Roman Military Presence in the Heart of the Dardanian Mining District. In : C. S. Sommer / S. Matešic (éds.): Limes XXIII. Proceedings of the 23rd International Congress of Roman Frontier Studies, Ingolstadt 2015. Mainz 2018, 426-436.

Villages in Podujevo